The 1961 World Table Tennis Championships men's singles was the 26th edition of the men's singles championship. 

Chuang Tse-Tung defeated Li Fu-Jung in the final, winning three sets to one to secure the title.

Results

See also
 List of World Table Tennis Championships medalists

References

-